Lode Runner 3-D is a Nintendo 64 game in the Lode Runner franchise.  The game was developed by Big Bang and was released in 1999 in North America and Europe by Infogrames and in Japan by Banpresto. It is the first 3D game in the Lode Runner series.

Gameplay

The game mechanics are similar to the original: the players outrun enemies by using alternate routes, sliding on ropes, climbing ladders, or drilling holes in the ground to trap them. This game differs from the other incarnations of games from the series because of its apparent three-dimensional perspective. While essentially running in 2-dimensional space, the player has an option to move in another direction every so often. The levels are mostly spirals that require climbing to complete. There are five worlds, and each one must be unlocked by finding five cards from the previous world, excluding the first. Each world is divided into five stages, with each stage divided into four levels. The general goal of each level is to collect a certain amount of gold to activate a portal that allows the player to continue. As the player progresses, each world adds new interactive objects and tools, as well as new obstacles.

Plot
Set after Jake Peril's adventures, he has been living an relatively peaceful life in his home planet with his wife Jane Peril until The Mad Monk Emperor of Planet Pandora has finally revealed himself, the Emperor has stolen all the gold resources of the planet earth so its up again for Jake Peril defeat the Mad Monks and finally their Leader once and for all.

Reception  

The game received average to positive reviews. IGN gave it a 7 out of 10 praising it for taking the original concept and putting it into a new format that enhances the experience. GameSpot noted that the game was slower and harder than previous entries in the franchise.

Notes

References

External links

1999 video games
Banpresto games
Infogrames games
Nintendo 64 games
Nintendo 64-only games
Platform games
Video games developed in the United States